A total lunar eclipse took place on Friday, October 17, 1986, the second of two total lunar eclipses in 1986, the first being on April 24, 1986. The Moon was plunged into darkness for 1 hour, 13 minutes and 41 seconds, in a deep total eclipse which saw the Moon 24.545% of its diameter inside the Earth's umbral shadow. The visual effect of this depends on the state of the Earth's atmosphere, but the Moon may have been stained a deep red colour. The partial eclipse lasted for 3 hours, 36 minutes and 49.5 seconds in total. The Moon was 5.4 days before apogee (Apogee on Thursday, October 23, 1986), making it 3.3% smaller than average.

Visibility 
It was completely visible over Europe, Africa, Asia and Australia, seen rising over Europe, Africa on the evening of Friday, October 17, 1986, and setting over Asia, Australia on the morning of Saturday, October 18, 1986.

Related eclipses

Eclipses of 1986 
 A partial solar eclipse on April 9.
 A total lunar eclipse on April 24.
 A hybrid solar eclipse on October 3.
 A total lunar eclipse on October 17.

Lunar year series

Metonic series 
This eclipse is the third of four Metonic cycle lunar eclipses on the same date, October 17–18, each separated by 19 years:

Half-Saros cycle
A lunar eclipse will be preceded and followed by solar eclipses by 9 years and 5.5 days (a half saros). This lunar eclipse is related to two total solar eclipses of Solar Saros 143.

See also 
List of lunar eclipses
List of 20th-century lunar eclipses

Notes

External links 
 

1986-10
1986 in science
October 1986 events